Santa Rosa Mall is a shopping mall located in Mary Esther, Florida. It is anchored by Dillard's-closing 2023. It also has a 10-screen United Artists cinema outside the mall. Stirling Properties manages and owns the mall.

History
Jim Wilson & Associates built the mall in 1976. A wing anchored by McRae's was added in 1984; the store became Belk in 2006. Gayfers, an original anchor of the mall, became Dillard's in 1998. A carousel was installed in 1996.

It was sold in 1987 to California Public Employees Retirement System, sold back to Jim Wilson in 1997, and re-sold in 2003.

The mall underwent structural damage after Hurricane Opal in late 1995.

In 2007, the mall underwent renovations which included new flooring and the opening of new restaurants. Space was also made for a Ross Dress for Less store, although it never opened. The area ultimately became a Planet Fitness in 2013.

Belk announced its closure in December 2013.

On October 15, 2018, it was announced that Sears would be closing as part of a plan to close 142 stores nationwide.

In August 2019, the demolition of the former Belk began.

On June 4, 2020, JCPenney announced that this location would close as part of a plan to close 154 stores nationwide. This left Dillard's as the only anchor. 

On February 22, 2023, it was announced that Dillard’s Clearance Center would be closing by March 31 as part of a plan to close 3 stores nationwide. This leaves the mall without any anchor stores.

References

External links 
 Santa Rosa Mall Official Website

Shopping malls in Florida
Buildings and structures in Okaloosa County, Florida
Tourist attractions in Okaloosa County, Florida
Shopping malls established in 1976